The Ōpārau River is a river of the Waikato Region of New Zealand's North Island in the area occupied by Ngāti Hikairo.

Name 
The New Zealand Ministry for Culture and Heritage gives translations of "place of many fortified villages" or "place of falsehood" for Ōpārau. The official name was confirmed by Gazette as Ōpārau River on 21 June 2019.

Pollution 
The river is naturally turbid and had low to moderate levels of phosphorus and nitrogen, though it is among the poorer rivers for ammoniacal nitrogen, black disc and e coli measurements.

Nature 
Tiritiri Matangi peninsula, in the river's estuary, is a protected area of international ecological significance, as it is an important stop for migratory seabirds. Redfin bully and kōaro are common fish in the river. Fragrant fern and  Pānakenake grow in the valley.

Walks 
Walking tracks around the upper catchment of the river are the Ōpārau Route, Bells Track and Hihikiwi Track (part of Te Araroa long distance trail).

Roads and bridges 
From about 1900 a coach ran for passengers between Kawhia and Te Awamutu, with a launch between Kawhia and Ōpārau. Ōpārau Ferry Bridge opened in 1913. In 1924 a  concrete bridge was built over the Ōpārau to carry what is now SH31. Metalling of the road was completed in 1926.

In 1938 the Hamilton mayor, John Fow, and Chamber of Commerce were reviewing plans for a new link to Kawhia.

Hydroelectric 
The dairy opened in 1904.

School 
Ōpārau village had a school from 1902 until it closed in 2006.

See also
List of rivers of New Zealand

References

External links 
Photos -

 Landing shed and boat
 Bridge, store and probably dairy factory about 1912
 Bridge and landing shed about 1915
 Remains of hydroelectric dam in 1984
 Mangapapa Falls

Rivers of Waikato
Rivers of New Zealand
Ōtorohanga District